is a professional Japanese baseball player. He plays pitcher for the Hiroshima Toyo Carp.

External links

 NPB.com

1989 births
Living people
People from Kurashiki
Meiji University alumni
Japanese baseball players
Nippon Professional Baseball pitchers
Hiroshima Toyo Carp players
Nippon Professional Baseball Rookie of the Year Award winners
Baseball people from Okayama Prefecture